DeWitt Wiley "Bevo" LeBourveau (August 24, 1896 – December 10, 1947) was an American professional baseball player, an outfielder who appeared in 280 Major League games played and 1,584 contests in Minor League Baseball over 17 seasons (1918–1934). Born in Dana, California, LeBourveau attended Santa Clara University.

LeBourveau compiled a .349 lifetime batting average in the minors, leading the top-level American Association twice in hitting as a member of the Toledo Mud Hens, in 1926 (.377) and 1930 (.380). Each season he exceeded 100 runs batted in — the only times he passed the century mark in RBI during his career.

As a Major Leaguer, he played in 268 games over four years (1919–1922) with the Philadelphia Phillies, then a dozen more games in a 1929 trial with the city's American League club, the Athletics of Connie Mack.  In 788 at bats, he collected 217 hits, including 27 doubles and 11 triples as well as 11 home runs.  In the minors, his 2,315 hits included 120 home runs.

LeBourveau became a police officer in Placerville, California, after his baseball career ended in 1934; he died in his sleep at age 51 in Nevada City.

References

External links

 Find a Grave

1896 births
1947 deaths
Baseball players from California
Columbus Red Birds players
Kansas City Blues (baseball) players
Little Rock Travelers players
Major League Baseball outfielders
Milwaukee Brewers (minor league) players
Montreal Royals players
Nashville Vols players
Oakland Oaks (baseball) players
People from Shasta County, California
People from Placerville, California
Peoria Tractors players
Philadelphia Athletics players
Philadelphia Phillies players
Portland Beavers players
Seattle Giants players
Toledo Mud Hens players